Nan Brooks is a children's book illustrator who has illustrated numerous books from the 1970s onwards.
Nancy Florence Earl-Brooks:  Born: January 15, 1935 Died:  February 25, 2018;    
Brooks grew up in Cape May, New Jersey, and studied advertising design in Philadelphia. After graduation, she soon moved on to freelance illustration. Her colorful style is partly influenced by her interest in the Eastern religions. Her most successful work is her contribution to the Little Golden Books, The Princess and the Pea. Two of her recently successful works are As I Kneel by Bonnie Knopf, and Making Minestrone by Stella Blackstone.

References

Living people
American women illustrators
American illustrators
People from Cape May, New Jersey
Artists from New Jersey
Year of birth missing (living people)
21st-century American women